The 2012–13 Anaheim Bolts season was the fourth and final season of the Anaheim Bolts professional indoor soccer club, their second in the Professional Arena Soccer League. The Bolts, a Pacific Division team, played their home games at "Bolts Arena" in the Anaheim Convention Center in Anaheim, California. The team was led by managing partner Bernie Lilavois and interim head coach Jeff Tackett.

Season summary
The Bolts had mixed results in the regular season, compiling a 6–10 record. They placed fourth in the PASL's five-team Pacific Division and failed to advance to the postseason. The franchise fared better at the box office, placing sixth among the league's 19 teams in average home attendance.

The Bolts participated in the 2012–13 United States Open Cup for Arena Soccer. They received a bye in the Wild Card round then lost to the San Diego Sockers in the Round of 16, ending their run in the tournament.

Off-field moves
For the 2012-13 season, six of the eight Bolts' regular season home games are scheduled to be broadcast in English by KDOC-TV and in Spanish by Global TV. These games will be televised at 4:00pm PST on Sundays on a tape-delayed basis. The matches will be video-streamed live on the internet by Liquid Event TV and as internet radio by Kaotic Radio. Spanish-language play-by-play is handled by Oscar Sosa with English-language broadcasts handled by Nolan Sieger.

Bernie Lilavois, who began the season as both the team's general manager and head coach, announced that he would give up his coaching role after the December 15th match to focus on the team's operations as general manager. He cited recent problems with field turf, low attendance, and organizational issues in coming to this decision.

On December 21, 2012, the team announced the promotion of assistant coach Jeff Tackett to the role of "interim head coach" for the remainder of the season.

Roster moves
On November 27, 2012, the team announced the transfer signing of midfielder Jayro Martinez from Futbol Club Santa Clarita Storm of the National Premier Soccer League.

In early February 2013, the team added Japanese players Ryosuke Tarui and Yudai Yamaguchi to the roster.

Schedule

Regular season

† Game also counts for US Open Cup, as listed in chart below.

2012–13 US Open Cup for Arena Soccer

References

External links
boltsoccer.com Anaheim Bolts official website

Anaheim Bolts
Anaheim Bolts